A rhabdomyoma is a benign tumor of striated muscle. Rhabdomyomas may be either "cardiac" or "extra cardiac" (occurring outside the heart). Extracardiac forms of rhabdomyoma are sub classified into three distinct types: adult type, fetal type, and genital type.

Cardiac rhabdomyomas are the most common primary tumor of the heart in infants and children. It has an association with tuberous sclerosis. In those with tuberous sclerosis, the tumor may regress and disappear completely, or remain consistent in size. A common histological feature is the presence of Spider Cells, which are cardiac myocytes with enlarged glycogen vacuoles separated by eosinophilic strands, resembling the legs of a spider.

It is most commonly associated with the tongue, and heart, but can also occur in other locations, such as the vagina.

Malignant skeletal muscle tumors are referred to as rhabdomyosarcoma. Only rare cases of possible malignant change have been reported in fetal rhabdomyoma. The differential diagnosis in the tongue includes ectomesenchymal chondromyxoid tumor.

Additional images

References

Benign neoplasms
Heart neoplasia
Oral neoplasia
Pediatrics